is a metro station on the Osaka Metro Yotsubashi Line in Suminoe-ku, Osaka, Japan.

Layout
There are a side platform and an island platform with 3 tracks on the second basement.

Surroundings 

 Chidori Bunka
 Creative Center Osaka
 Kitakagaya Creative Village
 Morimura@Museum
 The Branch Art Lab

External links

  
  

Osaka Metro stations
Railway stations in Japan opened in 1972